Joseph James Little (June 5, 1841 – February 11, 1913) was an American printer by trade who served as a U.S. Representative from New York from 1891 to 1893, after winning a special election to fill a vacancy caused by the resignation of Roswell P. Flower.

Little was a veteran of the Civil War.

Biography
Born in Bristol, England, Little immigrated with his parents to the United States in 1846.  The family settled in Morris, New York.
He attended the common schools, was apprenticed to the local printer and entered a New York book-printing office to complete his trade.

Civil War 
During the US Civil War, he served in the Union Army 1862-1864, as corporal, first sergeant, and first lieutenant.

Congress 
Little was elected as a Democrat to the 52nd Congress to fill the vacancy caused by the resignation of Roswell P. Flower and served from November 3, 1891, to March 3, 1893.  He was not a candidate for renomination in 1892 to the Fifty-third Congress.

Later career 
Little served as commissioner of education and president of the Board of Education of New York City.

Little began business on his own account in a small way, having for a junior partner his former employer, Mr. Rennie. A third associate joining in the venture, the three with the combined capital of $5,000 started the printing office of Little, Rennie & Co. on Broome Street, in 1867. Being practical and hard working men they made their way by inches.

In 1873, William Jennings Demorest joined the firm and brought them the printing of his fashion papers. The business finally grew quite large and in 1871 was moved to an uptown location. In his present large quarters on Astor place, they do an enormous business in the printing of books, magazines, etc., employing about 500 persons. The present title of J. J. Little & Co. was adopted in 1876.  He remained in the printing and publishing business until his death in New York City on February 11, 1913.

Death 
He died on February 11, 1913, and was interred in Kensico Cemetery, Valhalla, New York.

Family 
Little's son was the tennis player Raymond D. Little.

Sources

1841 births
1913 deaths
Union Army officers
Burials at Kensico Cemetery
Democratic Party members of the United States House of Representatives from New York (state)
People from Morris, New York
19th-century American politicians
American printers
19th-century American businesspeople